Individual dressage equestrian at the 2014 Asian Games was held in Dream Park Equestrian Venue, Incheon, South Korea from September 20 to 23, 2014.

Schedule
All times are Korea Standard Time (UTC+09:00)

Results

Prix St-Georges

Intermediate I

Intermediate I freestyle

References

Results

External links
Official website

Individual dressage